Nowhere to Hide is a 1987 thriller directed by Mario Azzopardi. It stars Amy Madigan, Daniel Hugh Kelly and Robin MacEachern, as a family on the run from corrupt Marine officers. It also stars Michael Ironside, John Colicos, Maury Chaykin and Clark Johnson.

Plot

When two newly delivered helicopters crash mysteriously, Marine officer Major Rob Cutter (Daniel Hugh Kelly) decides to conduct his own investigation, since the men killed in the helicopter crashes were members of his squadron. He later discovers that the newly delivered helicopters crashed because of a defective C-ring that has been made of a weaker, less expensive alloy. Rob grounds all the newly delivered helicopters that have the faulty C-ring, and decides to go public with this, much to the objection of his friend and fellow marine Sergeant Mike Watson (Chuck Shamata), who reluctantly tells someone that he found the problem.

At home, Rob is killed by two hitmen, one of them Marchais (Maury Chaykin), in front of Rob's son Johnny (Robin MacEachern). As Rob's wife Barbara (Amy Madigan), a former marine, was spotted by Marchais, she hides in the garage. She burns Marchais' face with a blowtorch as he and his partner get away. She then gets upstairs to find Rob dead and Johnny traumatized by his father's death, having become mute as a result of post traumatic stress disorder. Before Rob was killed, Johnny unintentionally hid the C-ring in his transformer bot toy.

Barbara is questioned by local police, and they find top-secret documents which the men who killed Rob planted in the vase in the main bedroom, framing him. The military takes over the investigation and Rob's commanding officer, General Clay Howard (John Colicos) bails Barbara out of the questioning. Rob's squadron gives her the American flag out of respect, since Rob didn't receive a military funeral, due to being investigated for having top-secret documents in his possession.

Persistent journalist Mark Halstead (Clark Johnson), who has been investigating the helicopter crashes and suspects a cover-up, confronts Watson about the cover-up. Watson, guilt-ridden over having a hand in Rob's death, decides to talk to Halstead the next day about the cover-up. But he is watched by Marchais and his partner, who kill Watson by forcing his car to crash. Halstead comes to the cemetery where Rob is buried, and informs Barbara about Watson's death, and that there is a cover-up involving the helicopter crashes within Rob's death, the military, and the manufacturing company who delivered the choppers. Before he can go on further, Halstead is shot and killed by Marchais, and Barbara is framed for killing him. She is able to get away after a lengthy car chase.

Barbara calls General Howard for help, only to discover that he is the one who ordered Rob killed, because Halstead told her that Howard refused to see him, and the general mistakenly lied that he knew about Watson's death through Halstead. General Howard did not want Rob to go public with the defective part, since Howard authorized the delivery of the helicopters with the defective C-ring from the manufacturing company. While hiding in the motel, Barbara spots Marchais and his partner planting a bomb in her car. Just after he put Johnny in her car, Barbara moves the bomb out of her car and plants it in the car the hitmen are using. Johnny runs back to the motel to get the robotic toy that carries the C-ring. Barbara rushes to get Johnny and get back to the car. Marchais detonates the device, unknowingly killing himself and his partner, as Barbara makes her getaway.

With no one to turn to for help, Barbara turns to Rob's Vietnam War veteran-brother Ben (Michael Ironside), a reclusive survivalist living in an isolated wilderness with his two dobermans, to hide her and Johnny in his cabin. Johnny finds a military tracking device in the rim of their car, but can't tell anyone since he is still traumatized by Rob's death. Ben learns about Rob's death, and evaluates Johnny psychologically, knowing that he'll get over Rob's death soon. Barbara learns that Ben has become a recluse, because his son and his son's mother were killed in friendly fire in the Vietnam War, and he never talked to any of his squadron who did that bombing, except Rob who was his only trusted friend.

Barbara finds the C-ring in Johnny's robotic toy, and Ben identifies that it was defective. Then the dobermans spot Howard's men and Ben hides Johnny in the crawlspace. Barbara and Ben are able to kill some of Howard's men, but Ben is wounded in the shootout and one of his pet dobermans is killed. Barbara is hit in the shoulder, but is able hit the flammable tank to kill some of the men, before being buried by a pile of logs. Ben gets Johnny out of the crawlspace, but a corrupt marine mortally wounds Ben and is about to get Johnny. Ben uses the last of his strength to save Johnny before dying. Johnny screams out for his mother, before being taken by Howard's remaining men.

Barbara gets out of the pile of logs and finds Ben dead and Johnny kidnapped. She takes Ben's old truck and goes to the bar where Rob's squad-mates are. She shows them the faulty C-ring and informs them about the motive behind Rob's death and Howard's deceit.

Barbara goes to the abandoned warehouse where General Howard, the manufacturing company bigwigs William Devlin (Garrick Hogan) and Nick Thomas (Andrew Johnston) and their men are, handing them the C-ring part in exchange for Johnny. When Howard asks who else knew about the conspiracy, Barbara shows the corrupt general a wire she had on her, meaning Rob's squad heard about his involvement in Rob's death, and delivering the helicopters with the faulty C-ring. Rob's squadron surrounds the warehouse, but General Howard makes his getaway, while running over Devlin, killing him as Rob's squad detained everyone else. Barbara, a skilled helicopter pilot, pursues Howard on her own, as one of Rob's men stays with Johnny. She follows General Howard to the cliff-side dirt road, and shoots downs his car with a missile, killing General Howard and avenging the deaths of Rob and Ben.

Barbara and Johnny clear out Ben's cabin, and take Ben's surviving doberman with them as they head home.

Cast
 Amy Madigan as Barbara Cutter
 Daniel Hugh Kelly as Rob Cutter
 Robin MacEachern as Johnny Cutter
 Michael Ironside as Ben Cutter
 John Colicos as General Clay Howard
 Chuck Shamata as Mike Watson
 Clark Johnson as Mark Halstead
 Maury Chaykin as Marchais
 Géza Kovács as Owens
 Garrick Hagon as William Devlin
 Andrew Johnston as Nick Thomas
 Timothy Webber as Kevin
 Réal Andrews as Luther
 Philip Akin as Harvey
 Peter Blackwood as Ted
 Shirley Merovitz as Shirley
 Vlasta Vrána as Sonny Cambria
 Jayne Eastwood as Jean Bollinger
 Philip Spensley as Roy Bollinger
 Ross Hull as Tory Bollinger
 Amy Gartner as Candace Bollinger

References

External links
 
 

1987 thriller films
Films directed by Mario Philip Azzopardi
Films produced by Julie Corman
Films produced by John Kemeny
Films scored by Brad Fiedel
1980s English-language films